These are the results for the 2005 edition of the TTT Eindhoven race, won by Gerolsteiner ahead of Phonak.

General Standings

19-06-2005: Eindhoven, 48.6 km. (TTT)

External links
 

2005
2005 UCI ProTour
2005 in Dutch sport